Doctor in Love is a 1960 British comedy film, the fourth of the seven films in the Doctor series, starring James Robertson Justice as Sir Lancelot Spratt and Michael Craig as Dr Richard Hare. This was the first film in the series not to feature Dirk Bogarde, although he did return for the next film in the series Doctor in Distress. It was loosely based on the 1957 novel of the same title by Richard Gordon.

Plot
Dr Richard Hare is a recently graduated medical intern at St Swithins Hospital. When his new romantic interest, nurse Sally Nightingale, suddenly leaves the hospital, he is devastated. He also leaves after being offered a job in private practice. But when his senior partner, Dr Cardew, has to visit California for a few months, Hare is left in charge.

He is joined by Dr Tony Burke who proceeds to airily order expensive equipment that the practice cannot afford but leaves the practice after breaking an arm. Dr Nicola Barrington joins the practice and Hare is suddenly in love again. The romance doesn't go well, especially when Sally re-appears and takes the job of practice secretary and eventually Nicola leaves.

Hare struggles through various comedic and other complications, mainly stemming from Burke's amorous attentions to female patients.

After enlisting Sir Lancelot Spratt's assistance to save a young dying boy, he diagnoses Spratt with appendicitis and decides to operate, despite Spratt's loud objections. He objects even more when Dr Burke fills in at the last moment as the anaesthetist. Despite Spratt's vociferous protestations, the operation is a success.

Hare is reunited with Nicola and returns to St Swithins.

Main cast

 James Robertson Justice as Sir Lancelot Spratt
 Michael Craig as Dr. Richard Hare
 Leslie Phillips as Dr. Tony Burke
 Joan Sims as Dawn
 Liz Fraser as Leonora
 Virginia Maskell as Dr. Nicola Barrington
 Carole Lesley as Kitten Strudwick
 Reginald Beckwith as Wildewinde
 Nicholas Phipps as Dr. Clive Cardew 
 Ambrosine Phillpotts as Lady Spratt
 Irene Handl as Professor MacRitchie
 Fenella Fielding as Mrs. Tadwich
 Nicholas Parsons as Dr. Roger Hinxman
 Moira Redmond as Sally Nightingale
 Ronnie Stevens as Harold Green
 Michael Ward as Dr. Flower
 John Le Mesurier as Dr. Mincing
 Meredith Edwards as Father
 Avis Bunnage as Mrs. Mimp (uncredited)
 Esma Cannon as Raffia Lady (uncredited)
 Patrick Cargill as Car Salesman (uncredited)
 Bill Fraser as Police Sergeant (uncredited)
 Joan Hickson as Sister (uncredited)
 John Junkin as Policeman (uncredited)
 Rosalind Knight as Doctor (uncredited)
 Roland Curram as Student Doctor (uncredited)
 Sheila Hancock as Librarian (uncredited)
 Robin Ray as Doctor (uncredited)
 Norman Rossington as Doorman (uncredited)
 Peter Sallis as Love-struck Patient (uncredited)
 Marianne Stone as Nurse (uncredited)
 Jimmy Thompson as Doctor (uncredited)
 Sally Douglas as Stripper (uncredited)
 Angela Browne as Susan (uncredited)
 Warren Mitchell as Haystack Club Manager (uncredited)

Production
Dirk Bogarde did not want to make any more Doctor films, so the filmmakers cast Michael Craig and Leslie Phillips as young doctors. Producer Betty Box later said the entire cast cost as much as Bogarde's current fee at that time. Craig said "it was no sweat, a bit like a mildly peasant piece of deja vu" because he had just worked with the same team on Upstairs and Downstairs. Box says "We all developed an affection for Doctor in Love. It was a gay, happy comedy which brought us into contact with some fine fresh talents."

Shooting took place at Pinewood Studios and on location around London including at University College London. The sets were designed by the art director Maurice Carter. The film features a visit to a strip tease club.

Reception
The film was the most popular movie at the British box office in 1960, followed by Sink the Bismarck! and Carry on Constable. 

Craig said "I don't think Doctor in Love'''s success had anything to do with me - King Kong probably could have played the part with the same result." Betty Box claimed it earned more than Doctor at Large. "We felt we'd pushed our luck to the ninth degree and should now forget about doctors and medical students", she said.

Not all reviews were positive, Monthly Film Bulletin'' described the film as "an antediluvian farce of staggering witlessness and vulgarity".

References

External links

Doctor in Love at Britmovie

1960 films
1960 comedy films
British comedy films
Doctor in the House
1960s English-language films
Films directed by Ralph Thomas
Medical-themed films
Films shot at Pinewood Studios
Films produced by Betty Box
Films set in London
Films shot in London
Films based on British novels
1960s British films